The Beatles' Hits EP was released 6 September 1963. It is the Beatles second British EP and was only released in mono, with the catalogue number Parlophone GEP 8880. It was also released in Australia and New Zealand.

Track listing
All songs were written by John Lennon and Paul McCartney and feature either Lennon or McCartney on lead vocals.

UK EP sales chart performance
Entry Date : 21 September 1963
Highest Position : 1 (for 3 weeks)
Weeks in Chart : 43 Weeks

References

1963 EPs
Albums produced by George Martin
The Beatles EPs
Parlophone EPs